Fagan Park, 38–48 Arcadia Road, Galston, New South Wales has been described as "the crown jewel of Hornsby Shire’s parks." The park covers 55 hectares of undulating land and includes a range of activities. It was once home to the Fagan family. In 1980 Bruce Fagan and his sister, Ida, donated the land to the New South Wales State Government. Hornsby Shire Council was appointed sole trustee. The park was officially opened by the Premier of New South Wales, Nick Greiner, MP on 5 November 1988.

History 

The Fagan Family

William Fagan was a free settler who emigrated from Derry in Ireland who arrived in Sydney in 1848. He later married Ann Waddell and the couple had three sons and four daughters. After their marriage the Fagans purchased  of land in Arcadia, New South Wales and the family established a successful citrus orchard. They were pioneers in the citrus industry in Dural, Galston and Arcadia, on the north-western outskirts of Sydney. Two of William and Ann's sons, William and Samuel, worked in the family business and later began their own operation at Dural. In 1900, Samuel and his wife acquired land at Galston and conducted their business on the property. They constructed 'Netherby,' a house made of bricks that were hand made. The property was the largest orchard in Galston and had a sizable workforce.

By the early 1930s, because of the arrival of the Great Depression, Samuel Fagan commenced to closed down his orchards. Bruce Fagan, the youngest child in the family, ran a herd of Jersey dairy cattle on the property after the closure of the orchard. He later added a dairy building to the property and commenced a renowned cattle breeding programme. In 1980 Bruce Fagan and his sister, Ida, donated the original property, "Fagan Park," to the Department of Lands. The Hornsby Shire Council was appointed as the sole trustee for the park. Before his death in 1984, Bruce Fagan was consulted regarding development plans for the site.

Bicentennial Project

The Bicentenary of Australia was celebrated in 1988. It marked the occasion of the beginning of European settlement of Australia, with the arrival of the First Fleet of British convict ships at Sydney in 1788. A national programme of events and celebrations was organised to celebrate the occasion and Fagan Park was adopted as Hornsby Shire Council's bicentennial project. The Council received a government grant towards the cost of the planned "Garden of Many Nations." "Netherby" is regularly opened for inspection and the packing shed and milking complex are used as a rural museum.

Sport and Recreation 

 The Galston Parkrun event is held every Saturday at 8 am. This is a timed run over 5 kilometres. It is organised by volunteers and is free of charge.
 The Hornsby Electric Model Flying Club meets in the park.
 The Friends of Fagan Park meet regularly.
 The Fagan Park Eco Garden is a Council-driven community initiative that showcases environmentally friendly gardening techniques. Workshops are held regularly.
 Carr's Bush is an  area of remnant bushland within the park. It contains a network of short walking trails.
 The "Garden of Many Nations" is available to all visitors to the park.

Facilities 

There are many facilities for visitors to Fagan Park including:
 Picnic tables
 Large picnic shelters which can be hired which seat 18 to 36 people, depending on the size of the structure hired.
 Barbecues
 Children's playgrounds
 Bushwalking trails
 Sealed paths for bicycle riding, walking and running
 Toilets

References

External links 

 Fagan Wants You − Fagan Park Accessed 25 March 2022
 Fagan Park web page Accessed 9 November 2019
 Brochure − Your Guide to Fagan Park Accessed 9 November 2019
 Hello Sydney Kids − Fagan Park Accessed 9 November 2019
 Brochure − Fagan Park Eco Garden Accessed 9 November 2019
 Self Guided Bush walks in Carr's Bush, Fagan Park Accessed 9 November 2019

Parks in Sydney
Galston, New South Wales
Suburbs of Sydney
Hornsby Shire